Hanns Kreisel (16 July 1931 – 18 January 2017) was a German mycologist and professor emeritus.

He was born in Leipzig in 1931. Kreisel was a professor at the University of Greifswald. His field was the classification of fungi, where he has studied this group of organisms not only in Germany but in almost all continents, as in Brazil, Seychelles, Vietnam, Cuba and Syria.  He had succeeded with his first collaboration to develop a scientifically sound and current fungal flora of Yemen. Kreisel also specialized in the fungal groups of gut fungi.

Kreisel was also the editor of several international scientific journals. He died in January 2017 at Wolgast.

Eponymous taxa
Chrysosporium kreiselii Dominik 1965
Kreiseliella U.Braun 1991
Kreiseliella typhae (Vasyag.) U.Braun 1991
Meliola kreiseliana Schmied. 1989
Passalora kreiseliana U.Braun & Crous 2002
Peziza kreiselii G.Hirsch 1992
Puccinia kreiselii M.Scholler 1996
Tulostoma kreiselii G.Moreno, E.Horak & Altés 2002

References

1931 births
2017 deaths
German mycologists